Deniston Clive Marshall (born 17 October 1940) is a former Australian rules footballer who represented  in the West Australian National Football League (WANFL) and  in the Victorian Football League (VFL) from the 1950s to the 1970s.

Early life and playing career
Born in Fremantle, Western Australia, Marshall was already a star while playing for the Mosman Park Juniors. His grandfather, Gordon Tuxford, had captained  in the 1920s.
He represented his State in that first year. He went on to represent Western Australia 14 times during his career — and represented Victoria a further eight times in interstate matches. Marshall won four best and fairest awards with Claremont and was runner up in the 1962 Sandover Medal award for the fairest and best player in the WANFL.

When recruited to Victorian side Geelong in 1964 he burst on to the League scene as a readymade star. Marshall's stay in Victoria would be brief. He played just 85 games from 1964 to 1968 but won the Cats' best-and-fairest in 1966 and was second in the Brownlow Medal in 1968 before returning to Perth at the age of 27.

He was selected in the All-Australian Team following the 1966 Hobart Carnival.

Post playing career
After retiring, Marshall worked in real estate development.

In 2004 he was inducted into both the WA Football Hall of Fame and the Australian Football Hall of Fame.

In February 2008 it was reported that Marshall's property had been attacked during the night.

References

Bibliography

External links
 
 Deniston Clive (Denis) Marshall, WAFL Footy Facts
 AFL Hall of Fame
 Profile at WA Football Hall of Fame website

1940 births
Living people
Claremont Football Club players
Geelong Football Club players
All-Australians (1953–1988)
Australian Football Hall of Fame inductees
Carji Greeves Medal winners
West Australian Football Hall of Fame inductees
Australian rules footballers from Fremantle